Frank Mitchell (May 13, 1905January 21, 1991) was an American film actor. He appeared in over 70 films between 1920 and 1980.

Career
Frank Mitchell was a short, stocky, mischievous-looking comic and acrobat who got his start in entertainment by entering contests imitating Charles Chaplin. From there he broke into Vaudeville with a comedy acrobatic troupe and later toured with the International Seven in Europe. Aside from the stage, Mitchell also worked circuses performing stunts on horses as a trick rider. It was in the Vaudeville circuit that he met comic Jack Durant. The two formed the comedy duo "Mitchell & Durant," which appeared in The Earl Carroll Vanities of 1931. Their success also led them in to films, most notably providing comic relief in several Alice Faye musicals such as She Learned About Sailors, 365 Nights in Hollywood and Music Is Magic.

After Mitchell and Durant split, Mitchell found minor comedy roles throughout the 1940s and 1950s films. Because of his experience as a trick-rider, Mitchell found himself working in several westerns. One of his more famous characters was in a series of Westerns for Columbia Pictures playing the role of "Cannonball" (originally played by Dub Taylor). As television became more prevalent, Mitchell transitioned to smaller and often uncredited parts on television shows such as The Lucy-Desi Comedy Hour and The Red Skelton Hour. During this time in his career he was usually playing gangsters and straight-man roles. His last picture was a television movie titled Miracle of the Heart: A Boys Town Story in which he played a police officer.

The Three Stooges
At a few different times in his career Mitchell was a member of the Three Stooges. His first tenure with the team was in 1929, replacing Shemp Howard in the Broadway revue George's White Sandals alongside Ted Healy and Stooges main-stays Moe Howard and Larry Fine.

In 1943, he appeared in an unofficial team alongside Stooges alumni Fred Sanborn and Shemp Howard in the Universal feature Crazy House.

In 1953, he appeared with the Three Stooges in the Columbia short Spooks! and Goof on the Roof (both 1953), this time not as a member of the Stooges but rather as a foil for the trio's antics.

In 1974, The Three Stooges had booked a tour of stage and nightclub shows and personal appearances. However, Larry Fine had suffered a debilitating stroke in 1970, and Moe had been too sick to tour, so Moe suggested that Curly-Joe DeRita make the commitments rather than cancel and to assemble what would ultimately be the last official incarnation of the troupe. In the middle-stooge role Curly-Joe hired long-time Ted Healy Stooge Paul "Mousie" Garner. The head-stooge role was filled by Frank Mitchell who cut his hair to look more like Moe. They performed music-based comedy, mostly, a good portion of which was reworked from Mousie's nightclub act. The first appearance of the team was at a nightclub just outside Boston. Despite concerns by the team that the act would flop due to them not being the "real stooges", it was a great success. The act toured throughout the year, but was cut short due to DeRita losing his eyesight.  Aside from a few brief stints where Mitchell was ill (and filled-in for by Eddie Ennis) Frank Mitchell was the only actor to ever officially appear in the head-stooge role of Moe's other than Moe himself.

Personal life and death
Mitchell was born in New York City. He was married to Jane Fields from 1926 until her death in 1979. They had two children. Mitchell retired from films in 1980, and died of cardiac arrest on January 21, 1991, at age 85.

References

External links

1905 births
1991 deaths
American male film actors
Male actors from New York City
20th-century American male actors
20th-century American comedians